Gregory Boehme (born July 7, 1995) is an American professional soccer player who last played as a midfielder for USL League One club Richmond Kickers.

Career
Boehme played four years of college soccer at Virginia Commonwealth University between 2014 and 2017, where he made 47 appearances.

In 2017, Boehme played with USL PDL side Des Moines Menace.

On April 13, 2018, Boehme signed with USL side Richmond Kickers.

References

External links 
 

1995 births
Living people
American soccer players
Association football midfielders
Des Moines Menace players
People from Woodbridge, Virginia
Richmond Kickers players
Soccer players from Virginia
Sportspeople from the Washington metropolitan area
USL Championship players
USL League One players
USL League Two players
VCU Rams men's soccer players